Chondrolepis cynthia is a species of butterfly in the family Hesperiidae. It is found in the eastern part of the Democratic Republic of the Congo and south-western Uganda.

References

Butterflies described in 1916
Hesperiinae
Butterflies of Africa